The RAF News is the Official newspaper of the Royal Air Force.

Published every fortnight, the paper brings news, features on topical issues and life in the service, developments in military aviation and air power, reviews of significant events, and the history of the RAF. The paper is divided into smaller sections that cover news, cadets, veterans, obituaries, a bi-weekly feature, and a review section covering games, books, music, film, and TV that is titled "RnR"

See also
Navy News

References

Royal Air Force mass media
Military newspapers published in the United Kingdom